This article contains information about the literary events and publications of 1995.

Events
January 12 – The première of Sarah Kane's complete Blasted at the Royal Court Theatre Upstairs in London provokes outrage.
February 28 – The Diary of Bridget Jones column first appears in The Independent newspaper (London).
March 1 – The Dylan Thomas Centre in Swansea is opened by Jimmy Carter.
April 23 – World Book Day is first celebrated.
July 16 – Amazon.com, incorporated a year earlier by Jeff Bezos in Washington (state) as an online bookstore, sells its first book: Douglas Hofstadter's Fluid Concepts and Creative Analogies: Computer Models of the Fundamental Mechanisms of Thought.
August – Blackwell UK becomes the first British bookseller to offer online purchasing.
December 13 – The released film of Jane Austen's Sense and Sensibility has an Academy Award-winning screenplay by Emma Thompson.

Uncertain dates
Simon & Schuster pays US$4.2 million for hardcover publishing rights to The Christmas Box, self-published by Richard Paul Evans, which has appeared on The New York Times Best Seller list.
Fjærland in Norway becomes a book town.

New books

Fiction
Ben Aaronovitch – The Also People
Louisa May Alcott (posthumous) – A Long Fatal Love Chase
Roger MacBride Allen
Ambush at Corellia
Assault at Selonia
Showdown at Centerpoint
Julia Alvarez – In the Time of the Butterflies
Martin Amis – The Information
Kevin J. Anderson – Darksaber
Iain Banks – Whit
Pat Barker – The Ghost Road
Daniel Blythe – Infinite Requiem
Thomas Brussig – Helden wie wir (Heroes Like Us)
Christopher Bulis – The Sorcerer's Apprentice
Edgar Rice Burroughs and Joe R. Lansdale – Tarzan: the Lost Adventure
T. C. Boyle – The Tortilla Curtain
Albert Camus (posthumous) – The First Man (Le Premier Homme, unfinished)
Andrew Cartmel – Warlock
Mary Higgins Clark – Silent Night
Michael Connelly – The Last Coyote
Paul Cornell – Human Nature
Bernard Cornwell
Sharpe's Battle
Battle Flag
The Winter King
Douglas Coupland – Microserfs
Robert Crais – Voodoo River
Michael Crichton – The Lost World
Maurice G. Dantec – Les Racines du mal
Martin Day – The Menagerie
L. Sprague de Camp and Christopher Stasheff – The Exotic Enchanter
Samuel Delany – Hogg
Terrance Dicks – Shakedown: Return of the Sontarans
Umberto Eco – The Island of the Day Before
Stanley Elkin – Mrs. Ted Bliss
Kirill Eskov – The Gospel of Afranius («Евангелие от Афрания»)
Nicholas Evans – The Horse Whisperer
Timothy Findley – The Piano Man's Daughter
Richard Ford – Independence Day
Jon Fosse – Melancholy (Melancholia I)
Carlos Fuentes – The Crystal Frontier (La frontera de cristal)
John Gardner – GoldenEye
John Grisham – The Rainmaker
Barbara Hambly – Children of the Jedi
Craig Hinton – Millennial Rites
Nick Hornby – High Fidelity
Kazuo Ishiguro – The Unconsoled
Elfriede Jelinek – The Children of the Dead
Jo Jung-rae – Arirang
Welwyn Wilton Katz – Out of the Dark
Stephen King – Rose Madder
Joe R. Lansdale – The Two-Bear Mambo
John le Carré – Our Game
Andy Lane
The Empire of Glass
Original Sin
Paul Leonard
Dancing the Code
Toy Soldiers
Jonathan Lethem – Amnesia Moon
Barry Letts – The Ghosts of N-Space
Robert Ludlum – The Apocalypse Watch
Steve Lyons
Head Games
Time of Your Life
Frank McCourt – Angela's Ashes (semi-autobiographical)
Val McDermid – The Mermaids Singing
David A. McIntee
Lords of the Storm
Sanctuary
Andreï Makine – Dreams of My Russian Summers (Le Testament français)
Henning Mankell – Chronicler of the Winds (Comédia infantil)
Stephen Marley – Managra
Zakes Mda – Ways of Dying
James A. Michener – Miracle in Seville
Rohinton Mistry – A Fine Balance
Mary McGarry Morris – Songs in Ordinary Time
Kate Orman – Set Piece
Terry Pratchett – Maskerade
Douglas Preston and Lincoln Child
Relic
Mount Dragon
Christoph Ransmayr – The Dog King (Morbus Kitahara)
Jean Raspail – L'Anneau du pêcheur
Justin Richards – System Shock
Andrew Roberts – The Aachen Memorandum
Gareth Roberts
The Romance of Crime
Zamper
J. Jill Robinson – Eggplant Wife
Philip Roth – Sabbath's Theater
Salman Rushdie – The Moor's Last Sigh
Gary Russell – Invasion of the Cat-People
Josè Saramago – Blindness (Ensaio sobre a cegueira)
W. G. Sebald – Die Ringe des Saturn: Eine englische Wallfahrt (The Rings of Saturn: An English Pilgrimage)
Sidney Sheldon – Morning, Noon and Night
Jane Smiley - Moo
Danielle Steel – Five Days In Paris
Neal Stephenson – The Diamond Age, or A Young Lady's Illustrated Primer
James B. Stewart – Blood Sport
Dave Stone – Sky Pirates!
Jim Turner, editor – Cthulhu 2000: A Lovecraftian Anthology
Andrew Vachss – Footsteps of the Hawk
Robert James Waller – Puerto Vallarta Squeeze
Dave Wolverton – The Courtship of Princess Leia

Children and young people
Chris Van Allsburg – Bad Day at Riverbend
Elizabeth Arnold – The Parsley Parcel
Marion Zimmer Bradley (with Rosemary Edghill) – Ghostlight
Jimmy Carter (illustrated by Amy Carter) – The Little Baby Snoogle-Fleejer
Donald Hall (with Barry Moser) – The Pageant
Virginia Hamilton (with Leo and Diane Dillon) – Her Stories: African American Folktales, Fairy Tales, and True Tales
Joe R. Lansdale – Tarzan: the Lost Adventure
Jim Murphy – The Great Fire
Alison Prince – The Sherwood Hero
Philip Pullman – Northern Lights (in US as The Golden Compass)
Diana Pullein-Thompson – I Wanted a Pony
Josephine Pullein-Thompson – Six Ponies
Mario Vargas Llosa (with Willi Glasauer) – Hitos y Mitos Literarios (The Milestones and the Stories of Greatest Literary Works)
Judith Viorst – Alexander, Who Is Not (Do You Hear Me? I Mean It!) Going to Move
Jacqueline Wilson – Double Act

Drama
Parv Bancil – Papa Was A Bus Conductor
Jez Butterworth – Mojo
Margaret Edson – Wit
Horton Foote – The Young Man From Atlanta
Jon Fosse – The Name
Sarah Kane – Blasted
Terrence McNally – Master Class
Lynn Nottage
Crumbs from the Table of Joy
Por'Knockers
Yasmina Reza – The Unexpected Man (L'homme du hasard)
Tom Stoppard – Indian Ink

Poetry

Mark Doty – Atlantis: Poems

Non-fiction
André Aciman – Out of Egypt
Jean Baudrillard – The Gulf War Did Not Take Place
John G. Bennett (posthumously) – The Masters of Wisdom 
George G. Blackburn – The Guns of Normandy
Wayne C. Booth, Gregory G. Colomb, and Joseph M. Williams – The Craft of Research
Pascal Bruckner – The Temptation of Innocence
L. Sprague de Camp – The Ape-Man Within
Tim Cornell – The Beginnings of Rome: Italy and Rome from the Bronze Age to the Punic Wars
Paul Davies – About Time
Robin Dunbar – The Trouble with Science
Mark Epstein – Thoughts Without a Thinker: Psychotherapy from a Buddhist Perspective
Bill Gates – The Road Ahead
Doris Kearns Goodwin – No Ordinary Time: Franklin and Eleanor Roosevelt: The Home Front in World War II
Nelson Mandela – Long Walk to Freedom
Leonard Nimoy – I Am Spock
Leslie and Les Parrott – Saving Your Marriage Before It Starts
Man Ray and André Breton – Man Ray, 1890–1976
Condoleezza Rice and Philip Zelikow – Germany Unified and Europe Transformed: A Study in Statecraft
Oliver Sacks – An Anthropologist on Mars
Simon Schama – Landscape and Memory
Sterling Seagrave – Lords of the Rim
Miranda Seymour – Robert Graves: Life on the Edge
Howard Stern – Miss America
Binod Bihari Verma – Tapasa vai Ganga Maithili, biography
Ibn Warraq – Why I Am Not a Muslim
Jane Wilson-Howarth – Bugs, Bites & Bowels (later editions as The Essential Guide to Travel Health)

Births
June 7 - Beth Reekles, Welsh author of young adult fiction
June 13 - S. C. Megale, American novelist and screenwriter

Deaths
January 9 – Peter Cook, English writer, comedian and satirist (born 1937)
January 30 – Gerald Durrell, English nature writer and naturalist (born 1925)
January 31 – George Abbott, American writer, director and producer (born 1887)
February 4 – Patricia Highsmith, American crime novelist (born 1921)
February 6 
 James Merrill, American poet (born 1926)
Xia Yan (夏衍), Chinese playwright and screenwriter, (born 1900)
February 21
Robert Bolt, English dramatist (born 1924)
Calder Willingham, American writer (born 1922)
February 23 – James Herriot, English veterinary novelist (born 1916)
March 9 – Ian Ballantine, American publisher (born 1916)
March 20 – Sidney Kingsley, American dramatist (born 1906)
April 14 – Brian Coffey, Irish poet (born 1905)
April 27 – Willem Frederik Hermans, Dutch writer (born 1921)
May 30 or May 31 – Ștefana Velisar Teodoreanu, Romanian novelist, memoirist and poet (born 1897)
June 14 – Roger Zelazny, American fantasy and science fiction writer (born 1937)
June 15 – Charles Bennett, English screenwriter (born 1899)
June 20 – Emil Cioran, Romanian philosopher and essayist (born 1911)
June 21– Katarína Lazarová, Slovak novelist and translator (born 1914)
June 25 – Qiu Miaojin (邱妙津), Taiwanese Chinese novelist (suicide, born 1969)
July 6 – Aziz Nesin, Turkish writer (born 1915)
July 13 – Ashapoorna Devi, Indian author and poet (born 1908) 
July 16
May Sarton, Belgian-born American poet, novelist and memoirist (born 1912)
Stephen Spender, English poet (born 1909)
July 25 – Janice Elliott, English novelist and children's writer (born 1931)
August 3 – Edward Whittemore, American novelist, (born 1933)
August 17 – Howard Koch, American screenwriter (born 1901)
August 19 – Pierre Schaeffer, French composer and writer (born 1910)
August 29 – Michael Ende, German fantasy novelist (born 1929)
September 8 – Eileen Chang, Chinese writer (born 1920)
October 13 – Henry Roth, Austrian-born American novelist and short story writer (born 1906)
October 22 – Kingsley Amis, English novelist (born 1922)
October 29 – Terry Southern, American screenwriter (born 1924)
 November 4 – Gilles Deleuze, French philosopher (born 1925)
November 10 – Ken Saro-Wiwa, Nigerian writer (executed, born 1941)
November 13 – Mary Elizabeth Counselman, American author and poet (born 1911)
November 16 – Robert H. Adleman, American novelist and historian (born 1919)
November 17 – Marguerite Young, American novelist, poet and biographer (born 1908)
November 20 – Robie Macauley, American writer and literary critic (born 1919)
November 22 – Margaret St. Clair, American science fiction writer (born 1911)
December 2 – Robertson Davies, Canadian novelist (born 1913)
December 9 – Toni Cade Bambara, American writer (born 1939)
December 30 – Heiner Müller, German dramatist (born 1929)

Awards
Nobel Prize for Literature: Seamus Heaney
Camões Prize: José Saramago

Australia
The Australian/Vogel Literary Award: Richard King, Kindling Does For Firewood
C. J. Dennis Prize for Poetry: Bruce Beaver, Anima and Other Poems
Kenneth Slessor Prize for Poetry: Peter Boyle, Coming Home From the World
Mary Gilmore Prize: Aileen Kelly, Coming Up for Light
Miles Franklin Award: Helen Demidenko, The Hand That Signed the Paper

Canada
Bronwen Wallace Memorial Award
Giller Prize for Canadian Fiction: Rohinton Mistry, A Fine Balance
See 1995 Governor General's Awards for a complete list of winners and finalists for those awards.
Edna Staebler Award for Creative Non-Fiction: Denise Chong, The Concubine's Children

France
Prix Goncourt: Andreï Makine, Le Testament français
Prix Décembre: Jean Échenoz, Les Grandes Blondes
Prix Médicis French: Vassilis Alexakis, La Langue maternelle and Andreï Makine, Le testament français
Prix Médicis International: Alessandro Baricco, Châteaux de la colère

United Kingdom
Booker Prize: Pat Barker, The Ghost Road
Carnegie Medal for children's literature: Philip Pullman, Northern Lights
James Tait Black Memorial Prize for fiction: Christopher Priest, The Prestige
James Tait Black Memorial Prize for biography: Gitta Sereny, Albert Speer: His Battle with the Truth
Cholmondeley Award: U. A. Fanthorpe, Christopher Reid, C. H. Sisson, Kit Wright
Eric Gregory Award: Colette Bryce, Sophie Hannah, Tobias Hill, Mark Wormald
Newdigate prize: Antony Dunn
Whitbread Book of the Year Award: Kate Atkinson, Behind the Scenes at the Museum

United States
Agnes Lynch Starrett Poetry Prize: Sandy Solomon, Pears, Lake, Sun
Aiken Taylor Award for Modern American Poetry: Maxine Kumin
American Academy of Arts and Letters Gold Medal for Fiction, William Maxwell
Carnegie Medal: Philip Pullman, Northern Lights
Compton Crook Award: Doranna Durgin, Dun Lady's Jess
Hugo Award: Lois McMaster Bujold, Mirror Dance
Nebula Award: Robert Sawyer, The Terminal Experiment
Newbery Medal for children's literature: Sharon Creech, Walk Two Moons
Pulitzer Prize for Drama: Horton Foote, The Young Man From Atlanta
Pulitzer Prize for Fiction: Carol Shields, The Stone Diaries
Pulitzer Prize for Poetry: Philip Levine, The Simple Truth
Pulitzer Prize for Biography or Autobiography: Joan D. Hedrick, Harriet Beecher Stowe: A Life
Pulitzer Prize for General Non-Fiction: Jonathan Weiner, The Beak of the Finch: A Story of Evolution in Our Time
Pulitzer Prize for History: Doris Kearns Goodwin, No Ordinary Time: Franklin and Eleanor Roosevelt: The Home Front in World War II
Wallace Stevens Award: James Tate
Whiting Awards:
Fiction: Michael Cunningham, Reginald McKnight, Matthew Stadler, Melanie Sumner
Nonfiction: André Aciman, Lucy Grealy (nonfiction/poetry), Suzannah Lessard, Russ Rymer
Poetry: James L. McMichael, Mary Ruefle

Elsewhere
New Zealand Book Award for Poetry: Michele Leggott, Dia
Montana Book Award for Poetry: Michael Jackson, Pieces of Music
Premio Nadal: Ignacio Carrión Hernández, Cruzar el Danubio
Premio San Clemente: Xurxo Borrazás, Vicious

Notes

References

 
Literature
Years of the 20th century in literature